Rick Cua (born December 3, 1948) is an American Christian rock singer, songwriter, bassist, author and ordained minister. He is a former member of the Southern rock band, Outlaws, whom he joined in 1980, but left in 1983 to pursue a full-time career in contemporary Christian music, the year after, wherein he gained popularity throughout most of the 1980s as a leather-jacket-wearing rocker with an arena rock sound featuring big, shout-along choruses.

Background 

After recording with Reunion and Sparrow records, he signed to Reunion in 1988, where his works began to take on a softer, more radio-friendly tone that included "sentimental ballads and pop-rock anthems in the style of Michael Bolton." Cua left Reunion in 1992 after just over a decade of radio airplay including six No. 1 Christian radio songs, creating his own label, UCA Records, on which he recorded three studio albums in the 1990s but received little radio play. He was nominated for a Dove Award and has received various other awards and recognition.

Cua took a hiatus from recording in 1998 and went to work as vice president of the creative department at EMI Christian Music Publishing, where he stayed until 2003. He focused on managing his own two companies: Rick Cua Entertainment, which manages artists and works in music publishing, film and TV licensing; and All for the King Music, offering coaching and inspiration to lay musicians through workshops and free electronic delivery of original worship music.

Celebrating his 25th year in ministry, Cua released his twelfth album, Won't Fade Away, in 2007. It was his first album in ten years.

Cua's father, his veteran guitar teacher, Basilio "Buz" Cua, died on May 19, 2009 at the age of 90 in his home town of Syracuse, New York. Cua was unable to go to his father's funeral, due to successful prostate cancer surgery.

Discography

References

External links 
 
 CrossRhythms Interview: The Singing, Bass Playing Veteran Who 'Won't Fade Away'
 [ Allmusic.com: Rick Cua]

1948 births
Musicians from Syracuse, New York
Performers of Christian rock music
Christian music songwriters
American performers of Christian music
Living people
Outlaws (band) members